Árpád Ambrusz (born 2 July 1980 in Nyíregyháza) is a Hungarian football (defender) player who plays for Nyíregyháza Spartacus.

Club career
Ambrusz began with Nyíregyháza Spartacus in 2004 as a defender. There he was a prosperous player from his first season. In 2008, he appeared as a loan player ate Rákospalotai EAC where he played nine matches. He would next play for the national team.

References

1980 births
Living people
People from Nyíregyháza
Hungarian footballers
Association football defenders
Nyíregyháza Spartacus FC players
Rákospalotai EAC footballers
Sportspeople from Szabolcs-Szatmár-Bereg County